Ezerets is a village in Shabla Municipality, Dobrich Province, northeastern Bulgaria.

Ezerets Knoll on Graham Land, Antarctica is named after the village.

References

Villages in Dobrich Province